Lakeside Hotel may refer to:

Crown Hotel (Siloam Springs, Arkansas), U.S., formerly Lakeside Hotel
QT Canberra, Australia, formerly Lakeside Hotel
Ein Schloß am Wörthersee, a German–Austrian comedy TV series, known internationally as Lakeside Hotel